The 1971 Virginia Slims International was a women's tennis tournament played on indoor carpet courts at the Hofheinz Pavilion in Houston, Texas in the United States that was part of the 1971 Women's Pro Tour. It was the second edition of the tournament and was held from August 2 through August 8, 1971. First-seeded Billie Jean King won the singles title and earned $10,000 first-prize money.

Finals

Singles
 Billie Jean King defeated  Kerry Melville 6–4, 4–6, 6–1

Doubles
 Rosemary Casals /  Billie Jean King defeated  Judy Dalton /  Françoise Dürr 6–3, 1–6, 6–4

Prize money

References

Virginia Slims of Houston
Virginia Slims of Houston
Virginia Slims International
Virginia Slims International
Virginia Slims International
Virginia Slims International